Teeters is a surname. Notable people with the surname include:

John Teeters (born 1993), American sprinter
Matt Teeters (born 1983), American politician
Nancy Teeters (1930–2014), American economist

See also
Teeter (disambiguation)